Cabinet of Donald Tusk may refer to:

 First Cabinet of Donald Tusk, from 16 November 2007 to 18 November 2011
 Second Cabinet of Donald Tusk, from 18 November 2011 to 22 September 2014